State Route 168 (SR 168) is an east-west state highway in the U.S. state of California that is separated into two distinct segments by the Sierra Nevada mountains. The western segment runs from State Routes 41 and 180 in Fresno east to Huntington Lake along the western slope of the Sierra. The eastern segment connects Lake Sabrina in the Eastern Sierra to State Route 266 in the community of Oasis, just to the west of the Nevada border. The eastern segment of SR 168 also forms a concurrency with U.S. Route 395 between Bishop and Big Pine.

Route description

The western segment of SR 168 begins as the Sierra Freeway in southeast Fresno at its interchange with Highway 180. After reaching Shephard Avenue at the northeast edge of Clovis, it becomes the two-lane Tollhouse Road before it begins its ascent up the Sierra Foothills. Near Humphreys Station, Tollhouse Road branches off and takes a direct route northeast to Tollhouse, while SR 168 bypasses northwest through Prather. SR 168 and Tollhouse Road then merge again north of Tollhouse. In Ockenden, SR 168 changes from Tollhouse Road to Huntington Lake Road. The highway then continues east up the Sierra Nevada, passing Shaver Lake before ending at Huntington Lake.

Before the reconstruction of urban Route 168 as a freeway, the route started at SR 41 and Shaw Avenue in Fresno. SR 168 ran along Shaw Avenue, Clovis Avenue, Third Street (Clovis), and Tollhouse Road to the current end of the freeway.

SR 168 cannot be used to cross the Sierra Nevada. The closest crossings of the Sierra Nevada are SR 120 via Tioga Pass to the north and Sherman Pass to the south. Both of these passes are accessible in warmer months only.

The eastern segment of SR 168 has its western terminus at Lake Sabrina on the eastern slope of the Sierra Nevada. This rural mountain road runs east to the town of Bishop, then joins U.S. Route 395 for 14.6 miles, and separates from 395 in Big Pine. SR 168 then climbs into the White Mountains through Westgard Pass, passing the Ancient Bristlecone Pine Forest. From here it traverses Deep Springs Valley, home of Deep Springs College, before crossing into Fish Lake Valley, where the segment ends at SR 266, just west of the Nevada Border. The segment of the highway from Lake Sabrina east to the community of Aspendell is subject to closure to most vehicles during the winter months, usually not opening until mid- or late-April, due to snow removal. The winter road closure gate is actually located to the southwest of Aspendell.

SR 168 is part of the California Freeway and Expressway System, and in the Fresno and Clovis city limits is part of the National Highway System, a network of highways that are considered essential to the country's economy, defense, and mobility by the Federal Highway Administration. SR 168 is eligible to be included in the State Scenic Highway System, and is officially designated as a scenic highway by the California Department of Transportation from Camp Sabrina to Brockman Lane on the Lone Pine Indian Reservation.

Two portions of SR 168 are designated as National Forest Scenic Byways: the segment between Clovis and Huntington Lake is the Sierra Heritage Scenic Byway, while the segment from Camp Sabrina to Brockman Lane is the Ancient Bristlecone Scenic Byway.

History
The eastern part of the route, from the eastern over Westgard Pass to the Nevada state line near Lida, Nevada predates the era of numbered highways and dates to the auto trail era as part of the Midland Trail, one of the earliest transcontinental roads in the USA. It was at Big Pine that the Midland trail forked in its westward journey to its eventual western termini, Los Angeles and San Francisco. The western descent from Westgard Pass into the Owens Valley was described as a "Welcome to California" view in the route guides for the Midland trail. Though SR 168 is the original routing of the Midland Trail, the route was realigned numerous times, and signs today mark U.S. Route 6 as the routing of the Midland Trail from California east to Denver, Colorado.

When the state of California began conceiving its own route network, modern SR 168 was conceived as a trans-Sierra highway connecting Fresno and Bishop. The proposed route, named the High Sierra Piute Highway, would have taken the highway over the  Piute Pass. However, the two segments were never connected. The rugged Sierra crest and eastern escarpment would have made construction very difficult and today two congressionally designated wilderness areas block the way: Kings Canyon National Park and the John Muir Wilderness. The traversable route now comprises Kaiser Pass Road from Huntington Lake to Florence Lake, various hiking trails from Florence Lake and through the Piute Pass to North Lake, and North Lake Road to a point along SR 168 east of where the highway connects to Lake Sabrina.

As originally designated SR 168 extended to the Nevada state line. The easternmost section of SR 168 was transferred to California State Route 266 in 1986.

Major intersections

See also

References

External links

California @ AARoads.com - State Route 168
Caltrans: Route 168 highway conditions
California Highways: Route 168
State Route 168 Transportation Concept Report

168
168
State Route 168
State Route 168
State Route 168
168
168
Inyo National Forest
Transportation in Fresno, California
Clovis, California
Sierra Nevada (United States)
Bishop, California